Emerald cuckoo refers to either of two cuckoo species in genus Chrysococcyx.

 African emerald cuckoo (Chrysococcyx cupreus) 
 Asian emerald cuckoo (Chrysococcyx maculatus)

 
Birds by common name